The general ticket, also known as party block voting (PBV) or ticket voting, is a type of block voting in which voters opt for a party, or a team's set list of candidates, and the highest-polling party/team becomes the winner. Unless specifically altered, this electoral system (at-large voting) results in the victorious political party receiving 100% of the seats. Rarely used today, the general ticket is usually applied in more than one multi-member district, which theoretically allows regionally strong minority parties to win some seats, but the strongest party nationally still typically wins with a landslide.

This systems is largely seen as outdated and undemocratic due to its extreme majoritarian results, and has mostly been replaced by party-list proportional (allowing fair representation to all parties) or first-past-the-post voting (allowing voters to vote for individual candidates in single-member districts). Similarly to first-past-the post and other non-proportional district based methods it is highly vulnerable to gerrymandering and majority reversal (when the party getting the most votes does not win the most seats). An example for the latter is the US Electoral College, the members of which are (overwhelmingly) elected using the general ticket.

In modern party-list systems, a full or partial return by the party-list proportional system is common. The partial return is referred to as a majority bonus or majority jackpot system, such modern systems award winners among more than the highest-polling party, if a low vote threshold is reached by a minority party, and often are counterweighted to do justice to the overall votes cast for smaller parties. This is used in France and Italy for a third and fifth of their regional councillors respectively, generally who then serve the region at-large.

Usage
At the national level it was used for as many as seven of the states, for any given regularly convened US Congress, in the US House of Representatives before 1967 but mainly before 1847; and in France, in the pre-World War I decades of the Third Republic which began in 1870.  It is in use in the Parliament of Singapore as to its dominant type of constituencies, those being multi-member, however moderated by the inclusion of at least one person of a different race than the others in any "team" (which is not necessarily a party team) which is selected by voters.

Fully majoritarian systems 
Countries using only party block voting or party block voting (in multi-member districts) mixed with a single-winner methods in single-member districts.

Mixed systems 
Countries using party block voting as part of a mixed system (combined with proportional representation)

France
The scrutin de liste (Fr. It has been abolished since, as to the French Parliament.

It is used on two-round basis to elect  of the regional councillors, and favours the largest party of that council's election.

Italy
As in the French version, its goal is to ensure that the assembly is controlled by the leading coalition of parties. There is one round of voting.

Singapore

This operates in parallel to elections from single-member district and nominations. It is moderated by the inclusion of at least one person of a different race than the others in any "team" (which is not necessarily a party team) which is selected by voters.

United States

For an at-large one-party return, many states adopted a general ticket.  The state voted for and returned an at-large delegation to the House of Representatives.

Ticket voting is used to elect Electoral College for presidential elections, except for EC members in Maine and Nebraska, and Alaska (starting in 2024), where most of the EC members are elected by first-past-the-post in congressional districts.

Under ticket voting, votes for any non-overall winning party's candidates do not receive any representation by elected members.

In terms of paper practices, the systems used varied between issue of:
a single ballot, listing all candidates and party affiliations (by means of bloc voting)
separate ballots for each seat

This was quite common until reserved to special use by the 1842 Apportionment Bill and locally implementing legislation which took effect after the 1845–47 Congress. Until the Congress ending in 1967 it took effect in rare instances, save for a two cases of ex-Confederate States – for one term – these had tiny delegations, were for top-up members to be at-large allocated pending redistricting, or were added to the union since the last census.

The following is a table of every instance of the use of the general ticket in the United States Congress.

See also
 Block voting
 Plurality-at-large voting
 Multiple-non-transferable vote
 Majority bonus system
 Plural district

References

Sources

External links
U.S. House of Representatives: House History

Non-proportional multi-winner electoral systems
United States congressional districts